The 1997–98 Liechtenstein Cup was the fifty-third season of Liechtenstein's annual cup competition. Seven clubs competed with a total of sixteen teams for one spot in the qualifying round of the UEFA Cup Winners' Cup. FC Balzers were the defending champions..

First round

|}

Quarterfinals 

|}

Semifinals 

|}

Final

External links
Official site of the LFV
RSSSF page

Liechtenstein Football Cup seasons
Cup
Liechtenstein Cup